Laza Morgan (born December 13, 1978 in Springfield, Massachusetts) is a Jamaican American reggae singer and rapper. Son of the reggae musician and artist Denroy Morgan, he started as a member of the Jamaican dancehall / hip hop trio formation LMS, alongside his siblings Noshayah Morgan and Miriam Morgan. Later on Otiyah "Laza" pursued a solo singing career.

He is best known for his single "This Girl" which was featured on Disney's Step Up 3D. Laza was also a featured artist on Alexandra Burke's hit single "Start Without You" in 2010 and appeared in the music video for the song. Laza is also featured in Kristina Maria's new single "Co-Pilot". He later released his mixed tape on June 7, 2011, after releasing his new hit single "One by One" featuring Jamaican singer Mavado, which topped the Jamaican Reggae Singles Chart. More recently Laza had launched two viral music videos on YouTube for his singles "Ballerina" and "Ya Sey Mi" with his production team Family Affair Productions. Laza's latest project is an EP titled Touch me with silence available for download on most music streaming services.

Discography

Singles

As lead artist

As featured artist

External links
Laza Morgan Official website
[https://www.instagram.com/lazamorganmusic/   on Instagram

Laza Morgan on Twitter

References

1983 births
American people of Jamaican descent
Reggae fusion artists
Living people